U.S. Highway 26 (US‑26) is an east–west highway in western Nebraska.  It enters the state from Wyoming just west of Henry.  The eastern terminus of US‑26 is in Ogallala at an interchange with Interstate 80 (I-80).  The highway largely parallels the North Platte River for the majority of its route in Nebraska and as such, runs at a northwest-southeast angle.  The highway also parallels the original paths of the Oregon Trail, the California Trail and the Mormon Pioneer Trail.

Route description
US‑26 enters Nebraska from Wyoming, and shortly thereafter enters Henry.  After passing through Morrill, US‑26 becomes a divided highway.  At Mitchell, US‑26 meets Nebraska Highway 29 (N‑29).  Continuing southeast, US‑26 enters Scottsbluff.  Through Scottsbluff, US‑26 runs concurrent with N‑71 and N‑92 on a highway which goes through northern Scottsbluff.  After N‑71 and N‑92 separate, US‑26 continues to Minatare, Nebraska, where the divided highway ends.  The highway runs due east until an intersection with Nebraska Link 62A (L-62A), when the highway turns south.  US‑26 passes through Bayard and, after crossing the North Platte River meets with N‑92 again near Chimney Rock.

US‑26 and N‑92 turn southeast towards Bridgeport.  At Bridgeport, N‑92 separates and US‑26 meets US‑385.  They cross the North Platte River together, and separate.  US‑26 continues southeasterly on the north side of the North Platte River.  At Broadwater, US‑26 begins its third concurrency with N‑92.  They run together through Lisco, Oshkosh, and Lewellen.  At Oshkosh, US‑26 meets Nebraska Highway 27.  At Lewellen, US‑26 and N‑92 separate for the last time and shortly thereafter, US‑26 crosses the North Platte River again.  After passing through Ash Hollow State Historical Park, the highway passes through no communities until meeting N‑61 northwest of Ogallala.  US‑26 runs concurrent with N‑61 the rest of its length in Nebraska.  The two highways go south to US‑30, then the three highways run concurrent into Ogallala.  They then separate from US‑30, turn south to cross the South Platte River and US‑26 ends at I‑80.

History
From the creation of the highway in 1926 until the 1930s, US-26 went north of the North Platte River east of Lewellen.  This alignment went east to Martin, where US‑26 met N-61 and the two highways went south from there into Ogallala.  When Lake McConaughy was built in the 1930s, the current alignment was constructed.

Major intersections

Related route

Between 1936 and 1959, there was a U.S. Highway 26N.  It went east along today's L-62A, then south along today's US-385 to just north of Bridgeport and east along today's US‑26 to Broadwater.  In those years, the mainline of US‑26 between Bridgeport and Broadwater went on the south side of the North Platte River, along today's Nebraska Highway 92.

References

26
Transportation in Sioux County, Nebraska
Transportation in Scotts Bluff County, Nebraska
Transportation in Morrill County, Nebraska
Transportation in Garden County, Nebraska
Transportation in Keith County, Nebraska
 Nebraska